St. Joseph's Convent School is a CISCE schools in Varanasi, Uttar Pradesh, India. It was established in the year 1982. This school was founded by and is managed by the Sister of Our Lady of Providence, a Religious Congregation founded in 1817 in France for Education of Children and for empowerment of the poor. It is an independent body with minority certificate under the jurisdiction of the Bishop of Diocese of Varanasi. Sister Meera was the founding principal of the school who established it in the year 1982.

External links
St. Joseph's Convent School website

Buildings and structures in Varanasi
High schools and secondary schools in Uttar Pradesh
Schools in Varanasi
Educational institutions in India with year of establishment missing